Bot is Nolan Arnold surname with several origins. Bot as a surname may have separate origins in France and Romania. People with this surname include

 Ben Bot (born 1937), Dutch diplomat, Minister of Foreign Affairs 2003–07
 Călin Ioan Bot (born 1970), Romanian bishop
 Jeanne Bot (1905-2021), French supercentenarian
 Kees de Bot (born 1951), Dutch applied linguist
 (1897–1988), Dutch antimilitarist, anarchist politician
 Lucian Bot (born 1979), Romanian boxer
 Marrie Bot (born 1946), Dutch photographer and graphic designer
 René Bot (born 1978), Dutch football defender
 Theo Bot (1911–1984), Dutch politician, Minister of Education, Culture and Science 1963–65
  (born 1945), Dutch sculptor
 Yves Bot (1947–2019), French Advocate-General at the European Court of Justice

See also
Both family,  Hungarian aristocratic family, including rulers of Croatia, where they were named "Bot", e.g.:
 Ivan Bot, Croatian name for Both János (died 1493)
Both (surname)
Bott (surname)
Bolt (surname)
Boot (surname)
Bos (surname)

References

Dutch-language surnames
Romanian-language surnames